Prestwood is a hamlet and former civil parish, now in the parish of Denstone, in the East Staffordshire district, in the county of Staffordshire, England. In 1931 the parish had a population of 41.

History 
The name "Prestwood" means 'Priests' wood'. Prestwood was formerly a township in the parish of Ellastone, from 1866 Prestwood was a civil parish in its own right, on 1 April 1934 the parish was abolished and merged with Denstone.

References

External links 

 

Hamlets in Staffordshire
Former civil parishes in Staffordshire
Borough of East Staffordshire